The 1983–84 British Home Championship was the 100th anniversary of the British Home Championship and the final football tournament between the Home Nations to be held, with both England and Scotland announcing their withdrawal from future competition, citing waning interest in the games, crowded international fixture lists and a sharp rise in hooliganism. Although the football competition was instituted in 1884, it was only the eighty-seventh tournament to be completed due to a five-year hiatus during World War I, a seven-year gap in World War II and the cancellation of the 1981 competition following threats of violence during The Troubles in Northern Ireland.

The tournament was surprising in its outcome, as the favourites in England and Scotland played each other into a 1–1 draw in the final game, thus allowing Northern Ireland to claim victory on goal difference, with Wales second. This was only the third time in 87 tournaments that (Northern) Ireland were undisputed champions, and the only time goal difference was used to determine a champion. It also marked the first time since 1928 that neither Scotland nor England placed in the top two. The trophy was permanently awarded to the Irish FA.

Table

Results

References

External links
Full Results and Line-ups

1984
1984 in British sport
1983–84 in Northern Ireland association football
1983–84 in Welsh football
1983–84 in English football
1983–84 in Scottish football
1983 in British sport